Bluecity was a London-based company providing electric car-sharing services, starting from 26 April 2017 to 10 February 2020. The cars provided by the service were Bolloré Bluecars by the Bolloré group.

Fleet

The service used the all-electric Bolloré Bluecar, which were adapted to suit London's left-hand traffic.

Operations
The scheme was operational first in London Borough of Hammersmith and Fulham from June 2017, and the London Borough of Merton followed shortly after.

In 2018, Bluecity located 10 cars at Gatwick Airport.

Bluecity shut down permanently on 10 February 2020, after reaching agreements with only three of London's thirty-three local authorities.

See also
 Autolib'
 BlueSG

References

External links
 Official website 

2020 disestablishments in England
British companies disestablished in 2020
British companies established in 2017
Carsharing
Car rental companies of the United Kingdom
Defunct transport companies of the United Kingdom
Electric vehicles
Transport companies disestablished in 2020
Transport companies established in 2017